Naungpin may refer to several places in Burma:

Naungpin (25°15′N 95°6′E) in Homalin Township, Sagaing Region
Naungpin (25°13′N 95°7′E) in Homalin Township, Sagaing Region